Kaçma Birader is a 2016 Turkish comedy film directed by Defne Deliormanli and Murat Kaman.

Cast 
 Zafer Algöz - Muammer
 Melek Baykal - Ramazan Kolçak	
 Emrah Kaman - Erdinç Kolçak	
 Cihan Ercan - Halil Tunçbilek	
 Algı Eke - Esma Tunçbilek
 Nursel Köse - Züleyha

References

External links 

2016 comedy films

Turkish comedy films
Films set in Istanbul
2010s Turkish-language films
Banijay